Melodian Records was an Australian independent record label founded in 1988 by record producer and music journalist Ian Meldrum with Michael Gudinski and Amanda Pelman. The name Melodian is a combination of 'melody' and Meldrum and Ian.

Background
In July 1987, Australian music television show Countdown ended. Meldrum had hosted the show since its induction in 1974. Meldrum wanted to start a record label as he felt "so many young pop acts weren't getting a go". The first two signings were Indecent Obsession (a pop band from the Gold Coast) and Roxus (a rock band from Melbourne).

The first album released on the label was Indecent Obsession's Spoken Words in November 1989. It peaked in Australia at number 28.

Former artists

See also 
 List of record labels

References 

Record labels established in 1988
Australian independent record labels
Pop record labels
1988 establishments in Australia